MTN may refer to:
 MTN Group, mobile telephone network operator in African and Middle Eastern countries
MTN-Qhubeka, cycling team sponsored by the telephone company
 Maritime Telecommunications Network, satellite phone network
 Martin State Airport, Baltimore, US, IATA code
 Mauritania, IOC and ITU code
 Manitoba Television Network, former branding of CHMI-TV, now known as Citytv Winnipeg
 MTN (TV station), Griffith, New South Wales, Australia
 Medium term note, a debt note
 Michigan Talk Network, radio network
 Metriol trinitrate, a liquid explosive similar to nitroglycerin
 Montana Television Network, US
 Montenegro, UNDP-Code
 Mountain Air Cargo, ICAO airline designator
 MountainWest Sports Network, dedicated to the Mountain West Conference
 Multilateral trade negotiations, trade talks associated with the General Agreement on Tariffs and Trade and World Trade Organization
 Mountain Dew (stylized as Mtn Dew), carbonated soft drink